Sir William Stewart Bovell (19 December 1906 – 15 September 1999) was an Australian politician who was a member of the Western Australian Legislative Assembly for the electorates of Sussex and Vasse between 1947 and 1971. Bovell served as a minister for over a decade under the premiership of Sir David Brand.

Early life
Bovell was born in Busselton, Western Australia in 1906. He attended the Busselton Central School.

During World War II, he served in the Royal Australian Air Force (RAAF), reaching the rank of flight lieutenant.

Public life
After the death of sitting member for Sussex, William Willmott, Bovell was endorsed by the Liberal Party for the seat. At the resultant by-election in June 1947, Bovell was elected to the Western Australian Parliament, winning an absolute majority of votes against two unendorsed Liberal candidates. His uncle, George Barnard had held the seat between 1924 and 1933. Sussex was abolished in 1950, and Bovell followed most of his constituents into the new seat of Vasse, which he held without difficulty for the rest of his career.

In 1959 Bovell was appointed Minister for Lands, Forests and Immigration, serving in these ministries until 1971. Between 1961 and 1962 he also took the role of Minister for Labour.

Bovell was posted to London as Agent-General for Western Australia in 1971. He served in this role until 1974.

Later life and death
After returning from London, Bovell retired to Busselton. He died in September 1999 at the age of 92.

Honours and legacy
Bovell was made a knight bachelor in 1976 for services to Western Australia. He received the accolade from Queen Elizabeth in Canberra in 1977.

References

1906 births
1999 deaths
People from Busselton
Liberal Party of Australia members of the Parliament of Western Australia
Australian Knights Bachelor
Australian politicians awarded knighthoods
Royal Australian Air Force personnel of World War II
Agents-General for Western Australia
Members of the Western Australian Legislative Assembly
20th-century Australian politicians